"He Ain't Heavy, He's My Brother" is a ballad written by Bobby Scott and Bob Russell.  Originally recorded by Kelly Gordon in 1969, the song became a worldwide hit for the Hollies later that year and also a hit for Neil Diamond in 1970.  It has been recorded by many artists in subsequent years.  The Hollies' version was re-released in 1988 and again was a major hit in the UK.

Scott and Russell were introduced to each other by Johnny Mercer, at a California nightclub.  Although Russell was dying of lymphoma and the pair met only three times, they managed to collaborate on the song.

Title
James Wells, Moderator of the United Free Church of Scotland, tells the story of a little girl carrying a big baby boy in his 1884 book The Parables of Jesus. Seeing her struggling, someone asked if she wasn't tired. With surprise she replied: "No, he's not heavy; he's my brother."

In a 1918 publication by Ralph Waldo Trine titled The Higher Powers of Mind and Spirit, Trine relates the following anecdote: "Do you know that incident in connection with the little Scottish girl? She was trudging along, carrying as best she could a boy younger, but it seemed almost as big as she herself, when one remarked to her how heavy he must be for her to carry, when instantly came the reply: 'He's na heavy. He's mi brither.'"

The first editor of Kiwanis magazine, Roe Fulkerson, published a column in September 1924 carrying the title "He Ain't Heavy, He's My Brother", the first use of the phrase exactly as it is rendered in the song title.

In the 1940s, the words, adapted as "He ain't heavy, Father, he's my brother", were taken as a slogan for Boys Town children's home by founder Father Edward Flanagan.  According to the Boys Town website, the phrase as used by Boys Town was said to Fr. Flanagan in 1918 by one of the residents while carrying another up a set of stairs.  The boy being carried is said to have had polio and worn leg braces.

The Hollies version

The Hollies' recorded the song in June 1969 at the EMI Studios (now Abbey Road Studios), with Allan Clarke on lead vocals. Elton John, who was working as a session musician at the time, played the piano on the song, as well their next single, "I Can't Tell the Bottom from the Top". The song was released on 26 September 1969 and reached No. 3 in the UK, and No. 7 in the US. The song was re-released in August 1988 in the UK following its use in a television advertisement for Miller Lite beer. It reached the No. 1 spot in the UK chart for two weeks in September 1988.

Weekly charts

Year-end charts

Neil Diamond version 

The Neil Diamond version entered at No. 68 on the Hot 100 on November 7, 1970 (UNI Records, 55264, length 4:09). The flip side was "Free Life". The song appears on Diamond's album Tap Root Manuscript, which was released in November 1970. The song was played by KGB-AM radio, San Diego, California, in late 1970, prior to the then-new Walk for Mankind, in dedication to those who would be walking for donations that day.

 Track listings
7" single

 He Ain't Heavy - He's My Brother - 3:59	
 Free Life - 3:11	

 Charts

Bill Medley version

Bill Medley recorded a version for the soundtrack of the film Rambo III. It was released as a single in the UK and peaked at No. 25, being on the chart the same time as the Hollies' version in 1988. It reached No. 49 on Billboards AC chart.

Track listings7" single He Ain't Heavy, He's My Brother - 4:30	
 Giorgio Moroder – The Bridge (Instrumental) - 4:00	

Charts

 Gotthard version

In 1996, Gotthard released their version of the song, which was poppier compared to their other songs and the structure was retained as a ballad like the original. In Switzerland, the cover was just as successful as the original. The Asian version of the album G contains the cover. It also appears on the compilation albums One Life One Soul – Best of Ballads and The Greatest Rock Ballads.

Track listingsCD-maxi'''
 "He Ain't Heavy, He's My Brother" - 4:37	
 "All I Care For" - 3:08	
 "One Life, One Soul" - 3:58	

Charts

 The Justice Collective version 

In 2012, a version of the song was recorded, and was released on December 17, 2012, by musicians and celebrities going under the name the Justice Collective, for various charities associated with the Hillsborough disaster.

The song went on to take the coveted Christmas number one position for 2012 on the UK Singles Chart.

Background
After the News International phone hacking scandal, members of the Farm along with Pete Wylie, and Mick Jones of the Clash performed at an anti-The Sun concert at the Liverpool Olympia in September 2011. Following this they formed the Justice Tonight Band and toured the United Kingdom and Europe for the next year in order to raise awareness of the Hillsborough Justice Campaign.

Initially, the idea was to re-release the 2009 single "The Fields of Anfield Road" by the Liverpool Collective featuring the Kop Choir; however, this idea was rejected by Peter Hooton as only a relatively small number of people would buy it. Inspired by Everton's Hillsborough tribute on September 17, 2012, the song was played at Goodison Park prior to their match against Newcastle United. It was then decided that a re-recording of this song by various artists including the Justice Tonight Band would be released as the charity single.

Keith Mullen of the Farm recruited Guy Chambers to produce the single and with Chambers offering free use of his Sleeper Studios to record the song. On October 25, 2012, Steve Rotheram, Guy Chambers and Kenny Dalglish announced plans of the single to be recorded by various artists such as Robbie Williams, Rebecca Ferguson, Paloma Faith, Beverley Knight, Melanie C, Holly Johnson, Mick Jones, Glen Campbell, Peter Hooton, Chris Sharrock, Glenn Tilbrook, Ren Harvieu, Dave McCabe, Paul Heaton, Hollie Cook, Jon McClure, John Power, Gerry Marsden, and two original members of the Hollies, Bobby Elliott and Tony Hicks.

Vocalists
 Andy Brown (Lawson)
 Gerry Marsden (Gerry and the Pacemakers)
 Paul Heaton (The Beautiful South)
 Glenn Tilbrook (Squeeze)
 John Power (Cast, the La's)
 Robbie Williams (Take That)
 Melanie C (Spice Girls)
 Rebecca Ferguson
 Holly Johnson (Frankie Goes to Hollywood)
 Paloma Faith
 Beverley Knight
 Eliza Doolittle
 Dave McCabe (The Zutons)
 Peter Hooton (The Farm)
 Ren Harvieu
 Jon McClure (Reverend and the Makers)
 Paul McCartney
 Shane MacGowan (The Pogues)
 Bobby Elliott (The Hollies)
 Tony Hicks (The Hollies)
 Hollie Cook (The Slits)
 LIPA Gospel Choir
 Clay Crosse
 Alan Hansen
 Peter Reid
 John Bishop
 Kenny Dalglish
 Neil Fitzmaurice

Musicians
 Chris Sharrock (Beady Eye) – drums
 David Catlin-Birch (World Party) – bass
 Paul McCartney – lead guitar
 Mick Jones (The Clash) – electric guitar
 Andrew "Davo" Davitt – acoustic guitar
 Guy Chambers – piano
 Elton John – piano
 Will Pound – harmonica
 Liverpool Philharmonic Orchestra – strings
 Richard Blake – trumpet/flugelhorn
 Matthew Lewis – trombone/euphonium
 Meredith Moore – French horn
 Will Roberts – tuba

Production
 Guy Chambers – producer
 Richard Flack – producer, engineer
 Oliver Som – engineer
 Liam Nolan – engineer
 Chris Taylor – engineer
 Jon Withnall – engineer
 Tony Draper – engineer
 Alec Brits – engineer

Charts

Year-end charts

Other versions
 In 1971, Donny Hathaway covered the song and released it on his self-titled album. He also published live performances of the song in several live albums.
 In 1975, Olivia Newton-John covered the song on her album Clearly Love and included it as the B-side on her single from the same album, "Let It Shine", which went to No. 1 on the US Adult Contemporary chart.  Record World'' said that "Olivia covers the tune with a wispy vocal and understated instrumentation, making the song all her own."

References

1969 songs
1969 singles
1970 singles
1988 singles
1996 singles
2012 singles
Songs with lyrics by Bob Russell (songwriter)
Songs written by Bobby Scott (musician)
The Hollies songs
Neil Diamond songs
UK Singles Chart number-one singles
Number-one singles in South Africa
Capitol Records singles
Parlophone singles
Epic Records singles
Uni Records singles
Scotti Brothers Records singles
Bertelsmann Music Group singles
All-star recordings
Charity singles
Rock ballads
Christmas number-one singles in the United Kingdom
Song recordings produced by Tom Catalano
1960s ballads